Blagodatnoye is a rural locality (a village) in Chaplinsky Selsoviet Rural Settlement, Kurchatovsky District, Kursk Oblast, Russia. Population:

Geography 
The village is in the Reut River basin, 48 km south-west of Kursk, 12 km south-west of the district center – the town Kurchatov, 4 km from the selsoviet center – Chapli.

 Climate
Blagodatnoye has a warm-summer humid continental climate (Dfb in the Köppen climate classification).

Transport 
Blagodatnoye is located 6 km from the road of regional importance  (Kursk – Lgov – Rylsk – border with Ukraine), on the road of intermunicipal significance  (38K-017 – Chapli – Blagodatnoye), 6 km from the nearest railway station Blokhino (railway line Lgov I — Kursk).

The rural locality is situated 54 km from Kursk Vostochny Airport, 126 km from Belgorod International Airport and 256 km from Voronezh Peter the Great Airport.

References

Notes

Sources

Rural localities in Kurchatovsky District, Kursk Oblast